Mike Mullin is primarily known as a young adult fiction writer. His debut novel, Ashfall (2011), is the first of a series dealing with the aftermath of the eruption of the Yellowstone supervolcano. Mike's latest young adult novel Surface Tension (2018) is a domestic terrorism thriller.

Personal life
Mike holds a black belt in Songahm Taekwondo. He lives in Indiana with his wife, Margaret and their multiple cats.

Reception
His debut novel, Ashfall, was named one of the top five young adult novels of 2011 by National Public Radio, a Best Teen Book of 2011 by Kirkus Reviews, and a New Voices selection by the American Booksellers Association.

He is represented by Kate Testerman of KT Literary.

Bibliography

Ashfall series
Ashfall (2011)
Ashen Winter (2012)
Darla's Story (novella, 2013)
Sunrise (2014)

Other novels
Surface Tension (2018)

References

External links

American writers of young adult literature
American thriller writers
Writers from Indianapolis